Professor Jacob Sheskin, sometimes known as Sheskin Jacob (1914 in Vilna, Russia – April 17, 1999 in Jerusalem) was an Israeli physician best known for his 1964 serendipitous discovery that thalidomide can be used as a treatment for leprosy at Hadassah University in Jerusalem.

Awards
 In 1975, the World Academy of Art and Science gave Prof. Sheskin a gold medal for his work. 
 in 1997, he was named Yakir Yerushalayim, or "Worthy Citizen of Jerusalem".

Bibliography
Sheskin, J. (1975). Thalidomide in lepra reaction. International Journal of Dermatology, 14(8), 575-576.
Sheskin, J. (1975). The case for invisible leprosy. International Journal of Dermatology, 14(5), 345-346.
Sheskin, J., Sabatto, S., Yosipovitz, Z., & Ilukevich, A. (1983). Lack of wrinkle formation in the fingertips of patients with Hansen's disease. Confirmation of previous observations. Hansenologia Internationalis, 8(1), 54-60.
Sheskin, J. (1980). The treatment of lepra reaction in lepromatous leprosy. International Journal of Dermatology, 19(6), 318-322.
Gorodetsky, R., Sheskin, J., & Weinreb, A. (1986). Iron, copper, and zinc concentrations in normal skin and in various nonmalignant and malignant lesions. International Journal of Dermatology, 25(7), 440-445.
Wahba, A., Dorfman, M., & Sheskin, J. (1980). Psoriasis and other common dermatoses in leprosy. International Journal of Dermatology, 19(2), 93-95.
Sheskin, J. (1978). Study with nine thalidomide derivatives in the lepra reaction. International Journal of Dermatology, 17(1), 82-84.
Sheskin, J., & Zeimer, R. (1977). In vivo study of trace elements in leprous skin. International Journal of Dermatology, 16(9), 745-747.

Footnotes

 References 
 Stevens, T., & Brynner, R. (2001), Dark remedy: The impact of thalidomide and its revival as a vital medicine. Cambridge, MA: Perseus.
 Joumel, L. (September–October, 2006). Four awards, one passion: Chemistry. CHEMISTRY International, 19-20.
 The New England Journal of Medicine (2001). Book Reviews. The New England Journal of Medicine, 345(3), 227.
 Brynner, R. (April 03, 2006). Thalidomide and Cancer. 3 Quarks Daily. Raza, A. (February, 2002). The third coming: Thalidomide and a final goodbye. The Biochemist. 21-23.
 BBC (January 31, 2005). The return of thalidomide BBC Inside Out.
 Barer, S. (2007). Celgene: The pharmaceutical phoenix. Chemical Heritage Magazine, 24(4). 
 Lutz, K. E., (unpublished manuscript). From tragedy to triumph: The approval of thalidomide.
 Penna, G. O., Martelli, C. M. T., Stefani, M. M. A., Macedo, V. O., Maroja, M. d. F., & Chaul, A. (2005). Thalidomide in the treatment of erythema nodosum leprosum (ENL): Systematic review of clinical trials and prospects of new investigations. Anais Brasileiros de Dermatologia, 80(5), 511-522. 
 Argaw, A. T., (2004). A study of the anti-inflammatory, anti-microbial and immunomodulatory properties of thalidomide in leprosy. Unpublished dissertation, Louisiana State University. 
 European Symposium Myeloma, Waldenstrom (2008) Final Report'', Annex 2, p. 19.

Israeli leprologists
Physicians from Vilnius
Vilnius University alumni
Lithuanian Jews
Lithuanian emigrants to Israel
Jews from the Russian Empire
Physicians from Jerusalem
1914 births
1999 deaths
20th-century Israeli physicians